The Great Northern UP Conference, is an athletic conference for high schools in the Upper Peninsula of Michigan. It was formed in 1965 as the Great Northern Conference and changed its name to the A-B-C Conference in 1984, and again to its current name in 1990. The football conference will be disbanded in 2023, but all other sports will continue.

Member schools

Current members

Former members

Membership timeline

Football
This list of conference champions goes through the 2022 season. 2022 is the last year that the GNC had a football conference, it will be disbanded for 2023.

References 

Michigan high school sports conferences